Coleophora nurmahal is a moth of the family Coleophoridae. It is found in Tunisia, Algeria, Israel, Iran, Saudi Arabia and the United Arab Emirates.

The larvae feed on Hammada corniculata and Hammada salicornica from within the galls of other insects.

References

nurmahal
Moths described in 1957
Moths of Africa
Moths of Asia